Ust-Yancher is a rural locality (a settlement) in Kochyovskoye Rural Settlement, Kochyovsky District, Perm Krai, Russia. The population was 126 as of 2010. There are 6 streets.

Geography 
Ust-Yancher is located 20 km southwest of Kochyovo (the district's administrative centre) by road. Shansherovo is the nearest rural locality.

References 

Rural localities in Kochyovsky District